Elaphrus citharus is a species of ground beetle in the subfamily Elaphrinae. It was described by Goulet & Smetana in 1997.

References

Elaphrinae
Beetles described in 1997